The Spanish Minister of War was the head of the . The position was established as the Royal Secretary of War in 1807. In 1977 it was collected with the Minister of the Navy and Minister of the Air to create the Minister of Defence.

List of officeholders

Kingdom of Spain (1700–1810)

Spain under Joseph Bonaparte (1808–1813)

Junta Suprema Central (1808–1812)

Kingdom of Spain (1810–1873)

Reign of Ferdinand VII (1814–1833)

Reign of Maria Christina of the Two Sicilies (1833–1840)

Regency of Baldomero Espartero (1840–1843)

Reign of Isabella II (1843–1868)

Sexenio Democrático (1868–1871)

Reign of Amadeo I (1871–1873)

First Spanish Republic (1873–1874)

Kingdom of Spain (1874–1931)

Second Spanish Republic (1931–1939)

Francoist Spain (1936–1975)

Kingdom of Spain (1975–present)

(3) Minister of the Army(6) Minister of War (7) Royal Secretary of War

Notes and references
Notes

References

War

es:Anexo:Ministros de Defensa de España